"Die Young" is a song by Australian indie pop band Sheppard. It was released as a single on 18 October 2019. "Die Young" came after frontman George Sheppard was forced to consider the band's future following a throat injury and surgery in 2019. In a statement, the band said "We began to ask what we wanted next, for ourselves individually, for the band and for our fans. We wrote 'Die Young' as though it was a 'final' Sheppard song; a song about appreciating each day and living it as though it was your last." The song was released as the lead single from the band's forthcoming third studio album, Kaleidoscope Eyes (2021).

Music video
The music video for "Die Young" was released on 17 October 2019. The clip uses muted colour patterns, haze and militaristic tableaux created by extras as the band communicate a sense of suffocation. Band member George Sheppard said "We kind of took our cues from the opening line 'in a world that's colourblind, we see it all through kaleidoscope eyes'. That was a really cool line we all thought, and that kind of set up the video clip.".

Reception
Jasper Bruce from The Industry Observer said the song "builds on the band's trademark energetic pop sound". RJ Frometa from Vents Magazine said "'Die Young' sees Sheppard in top form – lush production, full vocal harmonies, and an existential optimism." Uproxx said "With a pulsating chorus, this song is a confirmation that Sheppard is here for a good time and you should be, too."

Track listing
Digital download
"Die Young" – 3:55

Digital download
"Die Young" (Oliver Nelson remix) – 4:33

Charts

Weekly charts

Year-end charts

Release history

References

2019 singles
2019 songs
Sheppard (band) songs
Songs written by Jon Hume